Hans-Peter Durst (born 24 May 1958) is a German former para cyclist who won two gold medals at the 2016 Summer Paralympics, and a silver medal at the 2012 Summer Paralympics. He won gold medals at the 2015, 2017 and 2019 UCI Para-cycling Road World Championships.

Personal life

Durst is from Dortmund, Germany. He has two children. Durst has a loss of the sense of balance after a traumatic brain injury, caused by a car accident in 1994.

Career
Durst competed in T2 classification competitions, for athletes that use a tricycle. At the 2012 Summer Paralympics, he came second in the time trial T1–2 event. At the 2015 UCI Para-cycling Road World Championships, he won the road race and time trial T2 events.

In the road time trial T1–2 event at the 2016 Summer Paralympics, Durst's saddle fell off his tricycle after  of the race, and he rode for  without a saddle. Nevertheless, he won the competition, by over a minute.
He also won the road race T1–2 at the same Games.

In 2017, Durst won the time trial and road race T2 events at the Para-Cycling World Cup event in Emmen, Netherlands. At the 2017 UCI Para-cycling Road World Championships, Durst won the time trial and road race T2 events. As of 2018, Durst was the oldest professional cyclist registered with the Union Cycliste Internationale. He did not compete at the Para-Cycling World Cup in 2018, and missed much of the 2019 season as well for health reasons. At the 2019 UCI Para-cycling Road World Championships, he won the time trial event.

In May 2021, Durst chose not to compete in the delayed 2020 Summer Paralympics in Tokyo, Japan, due to the COVID-19 pandemic, the effect of the Paralympics on Japan's COVID-19 rates, and in solidarity with the Japanese people, most of whom did not want the Games to happen. In June 2021, he competed at the 2021 UCI Para-cycling Road World Championships.

In June 2022, Durst announced his retirement from para-cycling.

Honours
Durst was named Dortmund's athlete of the year for 2011 and 2012. He won the award again in 2016.

References

External links
 
 

1958 births
Living people
Paralympic cyclists of Germany
Paralympic medalists in cycling
Cyclists at the 2012 Summer Paralympics
Cyclists at the 2016 Summer Paralympics
Medalists at the 2012 Summer Paralympics
Medalists at the 2016 Summer Paralympics
Sportspeople from Dortmund
People with traumatic brain injuries
21st-century German people
20th-century German people